White Flight may refer to:

 White flight, the social phenomenon of white people migrating away from racially mixed regions
 White Flight (band), a musical artist and the name of his 2007 album
 "White Flight", a nickname for Gene Kranz, NASA flight director